Bangana lemassoni is a species of cyprinid fish found in the Ma River basin in Laos, the Red River basin in Vietnam, and Yunnan province in China.

References

Bangana
Fish described in 1936